Indonesia first participated at the Islamic Solidarity Games in 2005 and has sent athletes to compete in every Islamic Solidarity Games since. As of 2017, Indonesian athletes have won a total of 166 medals at the games, making it one of the top nations.

Medals

Medal Tally 
*Red border color indicates tournament was held on home soil.

Medals by sports

Medals of sports

Flag bearers

References